Trial by Jury is a 1994 American legal thriller film directed by Heywood Gould and starring Joanne Whalley-Kilmer, Gabriel Byrne, Armand Assante and William Hurt.

Plot

Crime boss Rusty Pirone is about to stand trial again and Daniel Graham of the district attorney's office is determined this time to put him behind bars.

Pirone sends one of his henchmen, a burned-out former corrupt cop named Tommy Vesey, to find a way to get him off the charges. Vesey realizes that a hung jury will lead to an acquittal and he investigates all of the jurors with a view to blackmailing them. Unsuccessful in his blackmail investigation he switches his attention to finding a juror that can be forced to work with him. He identifies single mother Valerie Alston, who he feels could make a difference in the jury room but can also follow orders. Vesey warns Valerie that unless she cooperates the Pirone family will be forced to kill her son and her elderly father.

Meanwhile Graham's key witness dies before making it to court. He sets his investigator John Boyle the task of finding a new witness. First to testify is Hughie Bonner, a former henchman of Rusty's. He identifies Rusty as a key underworld figure but is easily antagonized by Rusty's lawyer Leo Greco and lunges at Rusty, startling the jury. Greco calls out that Bonner is subject to a deal by Graham and his evidence is tainted as he's a convicted murderer. With no other choice, Graham and Boyle try to convince Rusty's uncle Johnny Verona to testify. Boyle finds video evidence of Johnny with another inmate in an intimate position in prison, indicating Johnny may be gay. Graham pressurises Johnny to do the right thing or risk being outed. With no other choice, Johnny agrees and testifies against Rusty linking him to the murders and seemingly sealing Rusty's fate.

Valerie attempts multiple times during the trial to find a way out of her predicament but is stopped each time by Vesey. Eventually Rusty breaks into her apartment and threatens her and her family. With no other options available, Valerie reluctantly complies. When the jury moves to deliberation the eleven other jurors vote guilty while Valerie holds out. She incurs the wrath of many of them, who feel Pirone's guilt is obvious. She manipulates the deliberation procedure to highlight perceived discrepancies in Graham's case turning the jury against one another and against her. One by one, three of the jury members decide to vote her way.

Pirone goes free. Graham is furious and unable to believe he could lose a slam-dunk case, he tasks Boyle with finding out what went wrong. Boyle poles each of the jurors who found Rusty not guilty and they each call out Valerie's role in convincing them to change their verdict. Graham suspecting that Valerie may have been tampered with meets with her discretely and tries to pressure her. Valerie adamantly denies any wrongdoing.

Pirone now free is worried that Valerie will eventually turn on him and he tasks Vesey and some thugs with monitoring her. Vesey though has fallen for the innocent Valerie and tries to protect her. However after Graham is seen leaving her apartment Rusty panics and orders a hit on her.

Valerie is kidnapped in broad daylight by three of Rusty's thugs and thrown in the trunk of their car. Vesey pursues them and tries to help her escape. In the ensuing shootout, Vesey manages to shoot the thugs but is mortally wounded. He warns Valerie that the Pirone family won't let her live and she needs to sort things with Rusty directly.

With nowhere else to turn, Valerie decides to use all of the skills she picked up while manipulating the jury and turn the tables on Rusty. She goes to his hideout dressed in a vintage dress and tries to seduce him. Rusty appears to fall for the ruse and starts to kiss Valerie. Suddenly he turns on Valerie and attempts to smother her. Valerie removes an ice pick from her purse and stabs Rusty to death. She then escapes the hideout and returns to her life.

Later Graham meets Boyle in the aftermath of the shootout. Boyle identifies Vesey's body among those of the thugs, and also tells Graham that Rusty has disappeared. They suspect that the Pirone family had enough of Rusty and may have murdered him. Graham confronts Valerie at her son's football game. He explains that he's not wearing a wire but he needs to know how a good person like her could help a violent thug like Rusty. Valerie gives a nondescript answer, but alludes to the fact that she had to protect her son and father.

Cast
 Joanne Whalley-Kilmer as Valerie Alston 
 Armand Assante as Rusty Pirone
 Gabriel Byrne as Daniel Graham
 William Hurt as Tommy Vesey
 Kathleen Quinlan as Wanda
 Margaret Whitton as Jane Lyle, Juror 
 Ed Lauter as John Boyle
 Mike Starr as Hughie Bonner
 Richard Portnow as Leo Greco 
 Lisa Arrindell Anderson as Eleanor Lyons 
 Jack Gwaltney as Teddy Parnell 
 Graham Jarvis as Mr. Duffy, Foreman
 William R. Moses as Paul Baker, Juror 
 Joe Santos as Johnny Verona 
 Beau Starr as Phillie 
 Bryan Shilowich as Robbie, Valerie's Son
 Stuart Whitman as Emmett, Valerie's Father
 Kevin Ramsey as Edmund
 Fiona Gallagher as Camille, Juror 
 Kay Hawtrey as Clara, Juror 
 Ardon Bess as Albert, Juror 
 Karina Arroyave as Mercedes, Juror 
 Andrew Sabiston as Elliot, Juror 
 Paul Soles as Mr. Kriegsberg, Juror 
 Jovanni Sy as Louis, Juror 
 Damon D'Oliveira as Rafael, Juror
 Andrew Miller as Krasny 
 Richard Fitzpatrick as Balsam
 Robert Breuler as Judge Feld 
 Ron Hale as Bailiff
 Jack Ellerton as Staring Drinker
 Gordon Welke as Hanson the Prisoner

Production
The original script by Jordan Katz was written under the titles of The Hanging Jury and Deadlock, once Heywood Gould came on board he re-wrote the original screenplay with additional uncredited revisions performed by David J. Burke and  Gina Wendkos.

The film was shot in Toronto and features a cameo by Canadian director David Cronenberg as a movie director.

Reception
Trial by Jury received negative reviews from critics, with a rating of 8% on Rotten Tomatoes.

Year-end lists 
 Worst films (not ranked) – Jeff Simon, The Buffalo News
 8th worst – Dan Craft, The Pantagraph
 Top 18 worst (alphabetically listed, not ranked) – Michael Mills, The Palm Beach Post

See also
The Juror - a 1996 film also featuring a mother picked for jury duty for a mafia trial and intimidated by mobsters.

References

External links

Trial by Jury at TV Guide (1987 write-up was originally published in the 1995 edition of The Motion Picture Guide)

1994 films
1994 crime thriller films
1990s English-language films
1990s legal films
American courtroom films
American crime thriller films
American legal drama films
Films about organized crime in the United States
Films directed by Heywood Gould
Films produced by Chris Meledandri
Films scored by Terence Blanchard
Juries in fiction
Morgan Creek Productions films
Warner Bros. films
1990s American films